Pharmaceutical sales representatives (formerly detailmen) are salespeople employed by pharmaceutical companies to persuade doctors to prescribe their drugs to patients. Drug companies in the United States spend ~$5 billion annually sending representatives to doctors, to provide product information, answer questions on product use, and deliver product samples. These interactions are governed according to limits established by the Code on Interactions with Health Care Professionals, created by the  Pharmaceutical Research and Manufacturers of America (PhRMA). This code came into practice in 2002 and has since been updated to help define ethical interactions between health care professionals and the pharmaceutical companies 

Companies maintain this provides an educational service by keeping doctors updated on the latest changes in medical science. Critics point to a systematic use of gifts and personal information to befriend doctors to influence their drug prescriptions. In the United Kingdom representatives are governed by a strict code of conduct from the Association of British Pharmaceutical Industries (ABPI). No gifts are allowed. Companies are fined and held in breach if they use the tactics described in this description.

Methods 
Doctors can receive small gifts, such as free dinners, event or travel tickets, clocks, free drug samples and swag like pens, paper pads, and office toys with company logos. Controversial inducements include jobs offers for the drug company, consulting / speaking fees, and all-expense-paid travel to resorts and exotic locations where attendance is limited or not mandatory.

Pharmaceutical Representative is a trade journal featuring common sales tactics such as how to close a tough sale by flattering a stubborn doctor. Along with flattery, the attractiveness of sales reps has been noted, with a trend of former cheerleaders entering the field. Researchers stated that "seduction appeared to be a deliberate industry strategy", and in informal survey by a doctor found that 12 out of 13 women sales reps said they had been sexually harassed by doctors.

Me-too drugs

Sales reps push new "follow on" or "me-too" drugs with free samples that are more expensive than existing generic drugs, such as Nexium which costs three times as much as its predecessor Prilosec, with no evidence of improved efficacy. With beta-blockers and statins, me-too drugs have improved results, and increased competition while lowering prices. As me-too drugs are similar but new, their side effects can be unknown and not well understood. Pharmaceutical marketing / reps assert a me-too drug may work better than another, but they "don’t test their me-too drugs in people who have not done well with an earlier drug of the same class."

Laws 

In 1990, the Food and Drug Administration (FDA) passed laws banning "gifts of substantial value" of drug companies to doctors, however this has changed the gifts from objects to meals and travel.

In 2006, New Hampshire forbid the sale of prescription data to commercial entities.

Encountering ill-informed reps at his practice Dr. Dan Foster, a West Virginia surgeon and lawmaker, introduced a bill to require reps to have science degrees. While it did not pass, it led to a disclosure of minimum hiring requirements.

Alternatives 

In Australia the government funds academic detailers that are impartial medical students who provide drug information to medical professionals.

See also 
 Bad Pharma (2012) by Ben Goldacre
 Big Pharma (2006) by Jacky Law
 Me-too compound
 Pharmaceutical companies
 Pharmaceutical marketing
 Ethics in pharmaceutical sales
 Sales techniques

References

Further reading
Drug Rush - Why the prescription drug market is unsafe at high speeds
Carlat, Daniel. "Dr. Drug Rep", New York Times magazine, 25 November 2007.

Sales occupations
Pharmaceutical industry

it:Informatore scientifico del farmaco